The black-tailed mosaic-tailed rat (Melomys rufescens) is a species of rodent in the family Muridae. It is endemic to the island of New Guinea.

Names
It is known as alks in the Kalam language of Papua New Guinea.

References

Baillie, J. 1996.  Melomys gracilis.   2006 IUCN Red List of Threatened Species.   Downloaded on 9 July 2007.

Melomys
Rodents of Papua New Guinea
Rodents of Indonesia
Mammals of Western New Guinea
Least concern biota of Oceania
Mammals described in 1877
Taxonomy articles created by Polbot
Taxa named by Edward Richard Alston
Rodents of New Guinea